Laishram Prem Kumar Singh (born 1 February 1995) is an Indian professional footballer who plays as a goalkeeper for Royal Wahingdoh in the I-League.

Career
Singh started his career with Langsning before moving to Royal Wahingdoh in 2014. In September 2014, during a Shillong Premier League match against Malki, Kumar saved a penalty that allowed Royal Wahingdoh to come out with a 1–0 victory.

Singh made his professional debut for Royal Wahingdoh in the I-League on 7 February 2015 against Dempo. He started the match and played the whole game as Royal Wahingdoh drew 1–1.

Career statistics

References

1995 births
Living people
Indian footballers
Royal Wahingdoh FC players
Association football goalkeepers
Footballers from Manipur
Shillong Premier League players
I-League players